DILF may refer to:
 
 Diplôme Initial de Langue Française, an initial diploma in Français langue étrangère
 DILF, a slang acronym meaning "Dad I'd Like to Fuck" (see "MILF")